The "ARL Tracteur C", or ARL Char C, was a French super-heavy tank design developed during the late Interbellum by the Atelier de Construction de Rueil (ARL) company. A full-scale wooden mock-up was part produced, but the project was terminated in favor of FCM F1, a directly competing design, which proved to be superior. The vehicle was meant to be extremely heavy and for that time period, very heavily armored. ARL C was intended to be very long to meet the requirement to cross trenches up to 7 meters wide. The tank was multi-turreted like FCM F1; however, unlike FCM F1, ARL C had the main turret in front of the very long hull right behind the secondary turret, not in the back of vehicle. The development path of the ARL C was extremely complex, due to the existence of a number of parallel super-heavy tank projects with overlapping design goals, the specifications of which were regularly changed. For each project in turn several companies submitted one or more competing proposals.

Second World War 

In September 1938, the ARL company was granted a development contract for the char maximum, the first proposal for which was presented by ARL in May 1939. It had a proposed weight of 120 tons, consisted of two detachable modules, armor up to 120 mm thick and could be armed with either a gun or a flamethrower. The commission decided that only the guntank would be considered, however.

In 1940, the specifications of ARL's tank, now named as "Tracteur C" to keep the project secrecy for outsiders, were changed: the tank was designed to have two turrets, 47 mm gun on front and on new larger turret, a 90 mm gun. ARL on 17 January 1940 ordered four turrets from the Schneider company, but it agreed only to build two 105 mm gun turrets and refused the two 90 mm gun turrets, as there was simply no capacity to manufacture them. In April 1940, after AMX's AMX Tracteur C programme was terminated, the subcommission advised to go ahead with both the FCM F1 and the ARL prototypes and immediately place an order for ten or fifteen of the former. That advice was given to a new overarching Commission of Tank Study, to which ARL presented a wooden mock-up on 11 April 1940; FCM presented one the next day. It transpired that the FCM project was far more advanced and could show the new tank in every detail. Due to this, the ARL's project was terminated. Only partially finished full-scale wooden mockup was produced.

After Fall of France, in July 1940, the wooden mockup was captured by German forces. However, as the French super-heavy designs were absolutely unnecessary for the Wehrmacht, the mockup was soon dismantled and design documentation was apparently destroyed.

Sources

https://www.chars-francais.net/2015/index.php/liste-chronologique/de-1930-a-1940?task=view&id=1643
https://web.archive.org/web/20170531081709/http://www.aviarmor.net/tww2/tanks/france/arl_tracteur_c.htm

Multi-turreted tanks
Super-heavy tanks
World War II tanks of France